is a feature film based on a true story about a delegation of 34 samurai to Europe in 1863, known as the Second Japanese Embassy to Europe (1863). It was first aired in Japan on March 21, 2006.

Plot summary

This documentary is about a group of samurai sent by the Japanese government to France at the end of the Edo period. At the time, all the ports of Japan were closed, cutting it off from the rest of the world. The samurai were sent to help solve diplomatic problems between Japan and Europe on December 29, 1863.  They were welcomed by every government and head of state they visited, including Napoleon III, in France. They were also photographed standing in front of Sphinx, in Egypt. The samurai returned with many products from their trip, including a book on wine production. They ended their expedition earlier than expected due to the need to report home about the astonishing technology in modernized countries.

Locations
Yamagata, Japan
Okayama, Japan
Paris, France
Burgundy, France
Marseille, France
Cairo, Egypt 
Alexandria, Egypt
Luxor, Egypt

It was filmed on location over the course of a year. It was among the first feature documentary by JNN Network to be filmed in such a wide variety of locations. Director Eiji Sone shot a total of about 300 hours of footage.

Cast
Shin Koyamada—Himself, Narrator

Crew
Directed by: Eiji Sone
Executive Produced by: Kenichi Hara
Executive producer by: Shin Koyamada
Produced by: Eiji Sone
Produced by: Shinji Yamada
Executive Producer: Shannon C. Murphy

Distribution
Japan
Tokyo Broadcasting System (TBS) 
Hokkaido Broadcasting Co. Ltd. 
A TV Television Broadcasting Co. Ltd. 
IBC 
Tohoku Broadcasting Co. Ltd. 
TV-U Yamagata Inc. 
TV-U Fukushima Inc. 
Broadcasting System of Niigata Inc. 
U-TV Yamanashi Inc. 
Shin-Etsu Broadcasting Co. Ltd. 
Tulip-TV Inc.
MRO 
Chubu-Nippon Broadcasting Company 
Mainichi Broadcasting System 
Sanyo Broadcasting Co. Ltd. 
RCC Broadcasting Co. Ltd. 
BSS Inc. 
TV Yamaguchi Broadcasting Systems Co. Ltd. 
I-Television Inc.
KU-TV Inc. 
RKB Mainichi Broadcasting Corporation 
Nagasaki Broadcasting Co. Ltd. 
RKK Kumamoto Broadcasting Co. Ltd. 
Oita Broadcasting System Inc. 
Miyazaki Broadcasting Co. Ltd. 
Minaminihon Broadcasting Co. Ltd. 
Ryukyu Broadcasting Co. Ltd.

Sponsors
Japan
Toyota
Santry
Häagen-Dazs
KDDI
Jacomo
ECC Junior

External links
Official website
Shin Koyamada on Sanyo Broadcasting Co. Japan
Website on Tokyo Broadcasting System
 

Samurai
History of the foreign relations of Japan
Japanese documentary television films
Documentary films about historical events